Blues My Name is the fifth studio album by American musician Hank Williams Jr. The album was issued by MGM Records as number E/SE 4344 and later re-issued by Polydor Records as 833 069-1 Y-1.

Track listing

Side One
 "Salt Lake City" (Curly Putman, Ronnie Hawkins)
 "A Good Leavin' Alone" (Ronnie Self)
 "Weary Blues from Waitin'" (Hank Williams)
 "Wrong Doin' Man" (James Golemon, Guy Golemon)
 "These Boots Are Made for Walkin'" (Lee Hazlewood)
 "Cry, Cry, Darling" (J.D. Miller, Jimmy C. Newman)

Side Two
 "It's Written All Over Your Face" (Mack Vickery)
 "When You're Tired of Breaking Other Hearts" (Curley Williams, Hank Williams)
 "Blues My Name" (Don Wayne)
 "Low As a Man Can Go" (Mack Vickery)
 "Old Frank" (Mack Vickery)
 "So Easy to Forgive Her (But So Hard to Forget)" (Dick Overby)

Personnel
Hank Williams Jr. – guitar, vocals
The Jordanaires – vocal accompaniment 
Mort Thomasson – engineer
Val Valentin – director of engineering
Acy Lehman – cover, design
Walden S. Fabry – photography

References

External links
 Hank Williams Jr.'s Official Website

1966 albums
Hank Williams Jr. albums
MGM Records albums
Polydor Records albums